Toshiko Kowada (小和田 敏子, Kowada Toshiko; born 1949) is a former international table tennis player from Japan.

Table tennis career
From 1968 to 1971 she won several medals in singles, doubles, and team events in the World Table Tennis Championships and in the Asian Table Tennis Championships.

The four World Championship medals  included two gold medals in the singles at the 1969 World Table Tennis Championships and the Corbillon Cup (women's team event) at the 1971 World Table Tennis Championships.

See also
 List of table tennis players
 List of World Table Tennis Championships medalists

References

1949 births
Japanese female table tennis players
Living people